Hundred Year Flood is the fourth studio album by the progressive metal/rock band Magellan.

Track listing

The first song on the album is actually split into 13 individual tracks.

 "The Great Goodnight" - 34:27
 "Family Jewels" (instrumental) - 5:53
 "Brother's Keeper" - 10:52

Credits 
 Trent Gardner - lead vocals, keyboards, trombone
 Wayne Gardner - guitars, bass, keyboards, backing vocals
 Joe Franco - drums
 Tony Levin – bass
 Ian Anderson – flute
 George Bellas – guitar
 Robert Berry – bass, guitar

References

External links
Encyclopaedia Metallum page

Magellan (band) albums
2002 albums